Bishop James Kavanagh BA STL Dip Ecom Sci, MA(Hons) (1914-2002), was an Irish priest and professor, who served as Auxiliary Bishop in the Dublin Archdiocese.

Early life 
Born in Dublin in 1914, he went to school at St. Laurences CBS and O'Connell School. Kavanagh went to Clonliffe College to study for the priesthood. While at Clonliffe, he completed his undergraduate BA in Philosophy at University College Dublin. While at school he played Hurling for O'Connell's, and played for the Dublin Minor Hurling side. At Cambridge, he played Soccer at inter-varsity level, and he was involved in Home Farm football club in Dublin, serving as Vice-president of the club. In later life he played golf, sponsoring the annual priests golf shield in Portmarnock.

Career 
In 1939 he was ordained a priest in a ceremony in St. Patrick's College, Maynooth, and graduated with a STL, he went on to teach Philosophy in St. Patrick's Missionary College, Kiltegan.

Dr. Kavanagh was appointed as the professor of Sociology in University College Dublin in 1966.

Fr. Kavanagh, served as Army Chaplin, as a curate in Crumlin and Westland row. He was sent by the Bishop to study Economics and Politics in Campion Hall, Oxford University. He was appointed by Archbishop John Charles McQuaid as first director of the Dublin Institute of Adult Education in 1951. In 1954 he went Cambridge University and completed a Masters in Economics in 1956 and returned to lecture in UCD. Appointed Bishop to the Dublin Diocese in 1973, (and Titular bishop of Zerta), he served as parish priest in the Church of the Holy Child, Whitehall/Larkhill, Dublin, from 1976 until 1980.

In 1977 he successfully intervened at the request of the families and trade union movement with Provisional IRA prisoners in the Curragh Military Hospital who were on Hunger Strike. He also spoke out and lent his name to campaigns for the release of the Birmingham Six, Guilford Four and Nicky Kelly.

He retired in 1991.

Personal life 
Kavanagh died in Sybil Hill nursing home in 2002. His younger brother Fr. Mark Kavanagh (1926-2014) was a Columban missionary priest.

Honours 
The Central Catholic Library in Merrion Square, Dublin, holds Dr. Kavanaghs collection of books he donated to it, and its Kavanagh Room is named after him.

Publications
Manual of Social Ethics by Dr. James Kavanagh, Gil, 1954.

References

20th-century Roman Catholic titular bishops
People educated at O'Connell School
Alumni of Clonliffe College
Alumni of University College Dublin
Auxiliary bishops of the Roman Catholic Archdiocese of Dublin
Irish sociologists
1914 births
2002 deaths
20th-century Roman Catholic bishops in Ireland